These are the matches that Real Zaragoza have played in European football competitions.

UEFA-organised seasonal competitions 
Real Zaragoza's score listed first.

European Cup Winners' Cup / UEFA Cup Winners' Cup

UEFA Cup

UEFA Super Cup

UEFA-non organised seasonal competitions

Inter-Cities Fairs Cup

Finals

Overall record
{| class="wikitable sortable" style="text-align:center"
|-
!Competition!!Pld!!W!!D!!L!!GF!!GA!!GD
|-
|align=left|UEFA Cup
|36||18||6||12||60||49||+11
|-
|align=left|Cup Winners' Cup
|37||20||6||11||64||38||+26
|-
|align=left|Super Cup
|2||0||1||1||1||5||-4
|-
|align=left|Fairs Cup
|36||22||4||10||74||48||+26
|-
!
Total
!111||60||17||34||199||140||+59
|}

Honours
UEFA Cup Winners' Cup
Winners: 1994–95
Semi-finals: 1964–65, 1986–87
Quarter-finals: 1967–68, 1995–96
UEFA Super Cup
Runners-up: 1995
Fairs Cup
Winners: 1963–64
Runners-up: 1965–66

Succession Boxes

References

Europe
Spanish football clubs in international competitions